Marumba juvencus is a species of moth of the family Sphingidae first described by Walter Rothschild and Karl Jordan in 1912.

Distribution 
It is known from Peninsular Malaysia, Sumatra and Borneo. The habitat consists of lowland forests

Description 
The species is very similar to  Marumba sperchius  and  Marumba tigrina .

References

Marumba
Moths described in 1912